The technical progress function is a concept developed by Nicholas Kaldor to explain the rate of growth of labour productivity, as a measure of technical progress.

The function is described by the following statements:

The larger the rate of growth of capital/input per worker, the larger the rate of growth of output per worker, of labour productivity. The rate of growth of labour productivity is thus explained by the rate of growth of capital intensity.
In equilibrium capital/input per worker and output per worker grow at the same rate, the equilibrium rate of growth.
At growth rates below the equilibrium rate of growth, the growth rate of output per worker is larger than the growth rate of capital/input per worker.
At growth rates above the equilibrium rate of growth it is the other way round, the rate of growth of output per worker is less than the rate of growth of capital/input per worker.

References
 
 

Economic growth
Innovation
Progress